is a Japanese former swimmer who competed in the 1992 Summer Olympics.

References

1973 births
Living people
Japanese female butterfly swimmers
Olympic swimmers of Japan
Swimmers at the 1992 Summer Olympics
Asian Games medalists in swimming
World Aquatics Championships medalists in swimming
Swimmers at the 1990 Asian Games
Asian Games bronze medalists for Japan
Medalists at the 1990 Asian Games
20th-century Japanese women